Kamloops—Thompson—Cariboo (formerly known as Kamloops—Thompson) is a federal electoral district in the province of British Columbia, Canada, that has been represented in the House of Commons of Canada since 2004. While the riding covers a large area, about three quarters of the population in the district live in the city of Kamloops.

History
This district was created as Kamloops—Thompson in 2003 from Kamloops, Thompson and Highland Valleys riding and small parts of Cariboo—Chilcotin and Prince George—Bulkley Valley ridings.

In 2004, the district was renamed "Kamloops—Thompson—Cariboo".

The 2012 federal electoral boundaries redistribution concluded that the electoral boundaries of Kamloops—Thompson—Cariboo should be adjusted, and a modified electoral district of the same name will be contested in future elections. The redefined Kamloops—Thompson—Cariboo loses a portion of its current territory consisting of the community of Valemount and area to Prince George—Peace River—Northern Rockies but is otherwise unchanged. These new boundaries were legally defined in the 2013 representation order, which came into effect upon the call of the 42nd Canadian federal election, scheduled for October 2015.

Demographics

Members of Parliament

Current Member of Parliament

Its Member of Parliament is Frank Caputo, a former Crown prosecutor who was elected for the first time in the 2021 election. He is a member of the Conservative Party of Canada.

Election results

Kamloops–Thompson–Cariboo, 2004–present

Kamloops–Thompson, 2003–2004

See also
 List of Canadian federal electoral districts
 Past Canadian electoral districts

References

 Library of Parliament Riding Profile (2004–present)
 Library of Parliament Riding Profile (2003–2004)
 Expenditures – 2008
 Expenditures – 2004
 Expenditures – 2000

Notes

External links
Website of the Parliament of Canada

British Columbia federal electoral districts
Kamloops